This page, one list of hereditary baronies, lists all lords of Parliament, extant, extinct, dormant, abeyant, or forfeit, in the Peerage of Scotland. For feudal barons (mainly Scottish), see List of feudal baronies.

Lordships of Parliament, 1233–1707

Before 1300

1301–1400

1401–1500

1501–1600

1601–1700

1701–1707

See also
List of baronies in the Peerage of England
List of baronies in the Peerage of Great Britain
List of baronies in the Peerage of Ireland
List of hereditary baronies in the Peerage of the United Kingdom

References

Lists of peerages of Britain and Ireland
Lists of nobility